The canton of Talant is an administrative division of the Côte-d'Or department, eastern France. It was created at the French canton reorganisation which came into effect in March 2015. Its seat is in Talant.

It consists of the following communes:
 
Agey
Ancey
Arcey
Aubigny-lès-Sombernon
Barbirey-sur-Ouche
Baulme-la-Roche
Blaisy-Bas
Blaisy-Haut
Bussy-la-Pesle
Drée
Échannay
Fleurey-sur-Ouche
Gergueil
Gissey-sur-Ouche
Grenant-lès-Sombernon
Grosbois-en-Montagne
Lantenay
Mâlain
Mesmont
Montoillot
Pasques
Plombières-lès-Dijon
Prâlon
Remilly-en-Montagne
Saint-Anthot
Sainte-Marie-sur-Ouche
Saint-Jean-de-Bœuf
Saint-Victor-sur-Ouche
Savigny-sous-Mâlain
Sombernon
Talant
Velars-sur-Ouche
Verrey-sous-Drée
Vieilmoulin

References

Cantons of Côte-d'Or